J72 may refer to:
 Gyrate rhombicosidodecahedron
 LNER Class J72, a British steam locomotive class
 Panther J72, a British luxury automobile